The Motor Cycling Club (MCC) is a British motorsports and Motorcycle sport club formed in 1901. It is the second oldest motorcycle club in Great Britain. It is a member of both the Motor Sports Association (cars) and Auto-Cycle Union (bikes). It organises the following Motorcycle trials and Car trials competitions:

 The Lands End Trial
 The Edinburgh Trial
 The Exeter Trial
 The MCC Speed Trials

In 1906 The Motor Cycling Club's gold medal was awarded to those who could compete the 391 mile journey from London to Edinburgh inside 24 hours. The fastest finisher was Tom Woodman (22h 38m) riding a Vindec Special motor-bicycle. Muriel Hind completed the trial in 22h 52m driving a 9 hp Singer Tricar with a female passenger.
Since the MCC members use 2, 3 and 4 wheeled vehicles current regulations prevent mixed competition events on race tracks citing safety considerations so the MCC Speed trials have been suspended, The classic Trials however continue to be one of the few events where motorcycles three wheelers and cars compete together.

References

Motorsport organisations in the United Kingdom
Motorcycle clubs in the United Kingdom
1901 establishments in the United Kingdom
Organizations established in 1901